The 2019 Sugarlands Shine 250 is a NASCAR Gander Outdoors Truck Series race held on October 12, 2019, at Talladega Superspeedway in Lincoln, Alabama. Contested over 94 laps on the 2.66 mile (4.28 km) superspeedway, it was the 20th race of the 2019 NASCAR Gander Outdoors Truck Series season, fourth race of the Playoffs, and first race of the Round of 6.

Background

Track

Talladega Superspeedway, formerly known as Alabama International Motor Speedway, is a motorsports complex located north of Talladega, Alabama. It is located on the former Anniston Air Force Base in the small city of Lincoln. A tri-oval, the track was constructed in 1969 by the International Speedway Corporation, a business controlled by the France family. Talladega is most known for its steep banking. The track currently hosts NASCAR's Monster Energy NASCAR Cup Series, Xfinity Series and Gander Outdoors Truck Series. Talladega is the longest NASCAR oval with a length of 2.66-mile-long (4.28 km) tri-oval like the Daytona International Speedway, which is a 2.5-mile-long (4.0 km).

Entry list

Practice

First practice

Final practice

Qualifying

Qualifying results

. – Playoffs driver

Race

Summary
Matt Crafton started on pole, but was overtaken by Todd Gilliland in the second lap. Johnny Sauter took the lead afterwards, but also lost it, to Sheldon Creed. The first caution occurred when Harrison Burton spun in the tri-oval. Creed maintained the lead and won Stage 1.

Ross Chastain took the lead, but Tyler Dippel wrecked and brought out a caution. During stage 2, Moffitt and Friesen were found to be locking bumpers, causing NASCAR officials to force them to take a pass-through penalty. Both teams and some of the broadcasters disagreed with NASCAR’s assessment. Stewart Friesen won Stage 2 after passing Brett Moffitt and Austin Hill. 

On lap 87, a large wreck occurred that took out Chastain after he turned across Creed's nose while trying to maintain his lead. In the final lap, Johnny Sauter held the lead until the tri-oval, where a block on Riley Herbst forced Herbst below the double yellow line. After NASCAR reviewed the footage, they deemed that Sauter's block caused Herbst to go below the yellow line. The race win was ultimately given to Boyd, while Sauter was demoted to 14th place.

Chastain and Tyler Ankrum left the race below the cutoff point for the playoffs. Due to Boyd's win, none of the other playoffs drivers were locked into the final round.

Stage Results

Stage One
Laps: 20

Stage Two
Laps: 20

Final Stage Results

Stage Three
Laps: 54

. – Playoffs driver

References

2019 in sports in Alabama
Sugarlands Shine 250
NASCAR races at Talladega Superspeedway